There are three soundtracks for the television series Scrubs. The first album was released as a CD, on September 24, 2002, by Hollywood Records.  The second album was released in 2006 and features songs used in Season Two to Season Five. The third album contains songs from the sixth season musical episode My Musical and was released on various music downloading sites in 2007.

Music from Scrubs

The songs on Music from Scrubs are taken from the songs that are played in the episodes of season 1, with the exception of "Overkill" which was featured in the premiere of season 2.

Scrubs: Original Soundtrack – Vol. 2

The songs on Scrubs: Original Soundtrack – Vol. 2 are taken from the songs that are played in the episodes of seasons 2 to 6.

Scrubs: "My Musical" Soundtrack

Scrubs: "My Musical" Soundtrack is the soundtrack released by Hollywood Records, Inc. It was originally released on August 7, 2007 on iTunes and Amazon.com. The songs are taken from the original songs composed and performed in the Season Six episode "My Musical". "Welcome to Sacred Heart (Reprise)" starts off with J.D.'s final thoughts.

See also
Scrubs (TV series)

References

External links
 Hollywood Records Homepage

Soundtracks
Television soundtracks
2000s soundtrack albums
Cast recordings
Rock soundtracks
Hollywood Records soundtracks
Lists of soundtracks